1796 Riga, provisional designation , is a dark asteroid from the outer region of the asteroid belt, approximately 70 kilometers in diameter. It was discovered on 16 May 1966, by Russian astronomer Nikolai Chernykh at the Crimean Astrophysical Observatory in Nauchnyj, on the Crimean peninsula. It is named after the Latvian capital Riga.

Orbit and classification 

The asteroid orbits the Sun in the outer main-belt at a distance of 3.2–3.5 AU once every 6 years and 2 months (2,247 days). Its orbit has an eccentricity of 0.06 and an inclination of 23° with respect to the ecliptic. The body was first identified as "1907 TG" at the U.S Taunton Observatory in 1907, and its first used precovery was taken at the Goethe Link Observatory in 1953, extending the asteroid's observation arc by 13 years prior to its official discovery observation. It is a member of the Cybele group of asteroids.

Spectral type 

The carbonaceous C-type asteroid is also classified as a very dark and featureless reddish P-type body by the NEOWISE survey of the Wide-field Infrared Survey Explorer (WISE). In the Tholen and SMASS taxonomy, it has a XFCU and Cb subtype, respectively.

Diameter and albedo 

According to the surveys carried out by the Infrared Astronomical Satellite IRAS, the Japanese Akari satellite and NASA's WISE/NEOWISE mission, the asteroid measures between 66.2 and 85.7 kilometers in diameter and its surface has an albedo between 0.028 and 0.05. The Collaborative Asteroid Lightcurve Link (CALL) agrees with the results obtained by IRAS, adopting a diameter of 73.83 kilometers with an albedo of 0.0376, based on an absolute magnitude of 9.84.

Rotation period 

Several rotational lightcurve for this asteroid were obtained from photometric observations since 1997. They gave a variety of rotation periods from 10.608 to 22.226 hours with inconsistent brightness variations in the range of 0.05 to 0.40 magnitude. CALL adopts the results of the most observations made by astronomer Julian Oey at the Australian Blue Mountains Observatory  in March 2014, which gave a period of  hours and an amplitude of  magnitude.

Naming 
The minor planet was named after Riga, the capital of Latvia and location of the Astronomical Observatory of the University of Latvia. The name was proposed by Matiss A. Dirikis, who was a member of the observatory at the Latvian State University, and after whom the asteroid 1805 Dirikis is named. The official  was published by the Minor Planet Center on 25 September 1971.

Notes

References

External links 
 Asteroid Lightcurve Database (LCDB), query form (info )
 Dictionary of Minor Planet Names, Google books
 Asteroids and comets rotation curves, CdR – Observatoire de Genève, Raoul Behrend
 Discovery Circumstances: Numbered Minor Planets (1)-(5000) – Minor Planet Center
 
 

001796
Discoveries by Nikolai Chernykh
Named minor planets
001796
001796
19660516